Char Bhuta is a village in Bhola District in the Barisal Division of southern-central Bangladesh.

References

External links
Satellite map at Maplandia.com

Populated places in Bhola District